Devaraagam is a 1996 Indian Malayalam-language film and video directed by Bharathan and starring Sridevi and Arvind Swamy. It also had KPAC Lalitha, Kozhikode Narayanan Nair, Zeenath, and Nedumudi Venu in supporting roles. The film was famous for its music which was composed by M. M. Keeravani. All the songs topped the hit charts. This was the movie in which actress Sridevi came back to Malayalam Industry after a long gap, as she was concentrated on her Bollywood career. A Tamil and Telugu dubbed version of the film was also released. Sridevi was reported to do a sequel titled as Sree Sree Devaraagam but the project was shelved post her untimely demise. This was also Sridevi's last Malayalam film to date.

Plot
The film opens with a young child climbing into a bullock cart and insisting that he also go with the cart to pick up the 'Shavundi' - a person who performs funeral rites and lives amongst the cremation grounds. Though essential to the funeral ceremonies, he is often considered frightening or unlucky. He certainly looks that way too - covered in ash and grime, sleeping in a bat-infested grove, and given ominous background music. The 'Shavundi' and child begin talking in the cart ride to the funeral, and then a flashback takes us to meet Lakshmi.

Life for Lakshmi (Sridevi) turns head over heels when Vishnu (Aravind Swamy), the new priest's son and priest-in-training, shows up in her village. Lakshmi is instantly intrigued by the new young man in town and strives to start a relationship with him. Certain antics and innocent clashes follow, and both of them fall in love. 

Later, problems arose due to Vishnu's status in society; i. e. he is a brahmachari and cannot marry. Later, Lakshmi visits an astrologer who says that Lakshmi and Vishnu's life together is full of difficulties. He also suggests that if Lakshmi and Vishnu visit a particular temple, all their sins in this life will end, and it is believed that a new life begins. So as he suggested, they both go ahead while Vishnu and Lakshmi secretly get married. They also get intimate with each other as they are married secretly now.

Meanwhile, Lakshmi's aunt visits her, and she decides to fix her marriage with her son.  Lakshmi's marriage is fixed with her cousin, Parthasarathy(Rajiv Krishna). When Lakshmi opens up about her love for Vishnu to her father, he blackmails her, threatening to kill himself. He also asks Vishnu to help him get Lakshmi married as he decided.

It was presumed that Vishnu's father would perform the rituals. But as he is ill, he forces Vishnu to perform the marriage rituals. Even though Vishnu hesitates, his father unknowingly forces him. Vishnu is forced to perform marriage rituals of his wife whom he secretly married. Seeing this, Lakshmi is heartbroken and helpless. She has to go through the ordeal. After marriage, Lakshmi's husband is informed that she loved Vishnu, and he says it's not a problem for him. Later, Lakshmi becomes pregnant. Lakshmi asks her husband to forgive her, and she will inform the others later. Lakshmi's husband says to her that he is impotent, and so he does not want anyone else to know the truth that Lakshmi is pregnant with another person's child.

Broken and distraught, Vishnu leaves his home and travels to many temples, hoping to find peace. He visits his father's old student and stays in his house. The student is now a renowned priest and impressed by Vishnu. He is interested in marrying his daughter Kokila to Vishnu, Kokila an advertisement actress, also likes Vishnu, but Vishnu is unable to forget Lakshmi and does not want to marry anyone else. Due to illness Kokila's father ask Vishnu to perform a puja which he was to perform. Even though he is hesitant, Vishnu agrees to go. The sudden view of kolam in front of the house reminds Vishnu of his Lakshmi, and when the door opens, he sees none other than Lakshmi itself he performs the puja for the child without knowing that it is his son, later due to grief and pain he returns to his father, he yells him about his journey and all about Lakshmi learning that Vishnu had performed the mangalyapuja for his own wife his father, a true brahmin curses that let Vishnu be unfit to perform any pujas and let him become a shaundi which is considered a sinful duty and due to his guilty feelings Vishnu leaves and becomes a shaundi.

At present, due to some circumstances, it is shown that Lakshmi's husband is dead, and Vishnu is the one who is performing funeral as Shavundi. Seeing this, Lakshmi becomes furious and reveals the secret that her only son cannot perform the last rites as his father is alive and he is none other than Vishnu, the one who blessed her son once as a pujari for long life. Hearing this, everyone is shocked. Knowing the truth, Vishnu refused to become the shaundi and take Lakshmi and his son away from society to lead a happy life.

Cast

Sridevi as Bhagyalakshmi 
Aravind Swamy as Vishnu Narayanan
KPAC Lalitha as Alamelu
Nedumudi Venu as Shankaran
Chippy as Indhu
Janardanan as Harihara Subramanya Iyyer
Kaveri
M. S. Thripunithura
Kozhikode Narayanan Nair
Narendra Prasad as Ramadhanapadikal
Priyanka Anoop
Reena
Ravi Menon
Zeenath as Malathy
Ravali as Kokila
Par
Rajiv Krishna as Parthasarathy

Production
Kasthuri was initially considered for the lead role, before the makers chose Sridevi. The reason that Sridevi accepted the role was because Sridevi's mother, Rajeshwari Ayyappan, had told Bharathan that Sridevi would act in one of his films. Sridevi dubbed for herself in the Tamil version as she was familiar with Tamil. Revathi dubbed for Sridevi in the Malayalam original.

Soundtrack
The music was composed by M. M. Keeravani and the lyrics were penned by M. D. Rajendran.

 Malayalam version

 Tamil version (Dubbed)

 Telugu version (Dubbed)

Awards
K. S. Chithra won the 1996 Kerala State Film Awards for Best Play Back Singer for the song "Sasikala Charthiya".

Reception
The film was not well received at the box office and was mostly panned by film critics. However, the film's music was universally praised and the lead cast received mostly favorable reviews.  The last Malayalam film of late Indian actress Sridevi Kapoor as heroine, it was a return to form for Sridevi, who started her career as a child star in several Malayalam films. Sridevi's performance in the film, her look (especially her effortless, glamorous song and dance routines) was well appreciated by the audience. Sridevi dubbed for her character in the Tamil version, while Revathi dubbed for Sridevi in the Malayalam original.

References

External links
 
 Devaraagam Soundtrack at Raaga

1996 films
Indian drama films
1990s Malayalam-language films
Films directed by Bharathan
Films scored by M. M. Keeravani
Love stories